Frankie J is the second studio album and first Spanish language album by Frankie J released on July 30, 2003.

Track listing

References

Chart position 

2003 albums
Frankie J albums
Columbia Records albums
Spanish-language albums